The Cajun French Music Association is an association dedicated to the promotion and preservation of Cajun music and culture.

History
The Cajun French Music Association is a non-profit organization of Cajuns and non-Cajuns whose purpose is to promote and preserve, not only Cajun music, but also various aspects of the Acadian Heritage. The CFMA was founded in Basile, Louisiana in November 1984 with Harry LaFleur of Eunice, Louisiana as its founder. Since its beginning with less than 30 members, the association has grown to a membership of approximately 2,000 families, serving seven chapters in Louisiana, three chapters in the Cajun region of Southeast Texas, and a chapter in Chicago, IL.

Hall of Fame
The CFMA publishes a Hall of Fame.

2019
 Allen Fontenot
 Daniel Cormier
 Kerry Boutte

2018
 Tim Broussard
 Julius "Pappa Cairo" Lamperez

2017
 Johnny Sonnier
 Ervine "Dick" Richard
 Lawrence & Judith Patin / LaPoussiere Cajun Dance Hall

2016
 Atlas Fruge
 Dieu Donne "Don" Montoucet

2015
 Ambrose Thibodeaux
 Leroy Broussard
 Milton Vanicor
 Hadley Castille
 Lee Manuel
 Elias Badeaux
 Will Balfa
 Jesse Stutes
 Cleveland Crochet
 Angelais LeJeune
 Nolan Cormier
 Rodney Balfa
 Willis Touchet
 Bois Sec Ardoin
 Geno Thibodeaux
 Doug Kershaw
 Barry Ancelet

2014
 Lee Benoit
 Felton Le Jeune 
 Wallace "Red" Touchet
 August Broussard

2013
 Roland Doucet
 Orsey "RC" Vanicor
 Jesse Legé

2012
 Jackie Caillier
 Ellis Vanicor

2011
 Rodney Miller
 Wayne Toups
 Larry Miller

2010
 Sheryl Cormier
 Clarence Martin Jr.

2009
 Doris Matte
 Leo Soileau
 Jim Olivier

2008
 Lionel LeLeux
 Jo-El Sonnier

2007
 Elias "Bobby" Leger
 Terry Huval
 Dave Soileau

2006
 Reggie Matte
 Clifton J "Cliff' Newman

2005
 Pierre Varman Daigle
 Voris "Shorty" LeBlanc
 Darrell Higginbotham

2004
 Jimmy C. Newman
 Ed Gary

2003
 Robert Bertrand
 Larry L. Miller
 Te Bruce Broussard - D.J.

2002
 Rufus Thibodeaux
 Cleoma Breaux

2001
 Dallas Roy
 Anthony "Tony" Thibodeaux
 Pete Bergeron - D.J.

2000
 Phillip Alleman
 Harry Lafleur

1999
 Nonc Allie Young
 Andrew Cormier
 Houston LeJeune - D.J.

1998
 Phil Menard
 Ivy James Dugas

1997
 Fernest Abshire
 Nathan Abshire
 Amedee Ardoin
 Dewey Balfa
 Alpha Bergeron
 Shirley Ray Bergeron
 Joe Bonsall
 Amedee Breaux
 Sidney Brown
 Vin Bruce
 Harry Choates
 Octa Clark
 Elton (Bee) Cormier
 Lesa Cormier
 Lionel Cormier
 Camey Doucet
 Jerry Dugas
 Joe Falcon
 Ledel (Blackie) Forestier
 Oran "Doc" Guidry
 Adam Hebert
 Leroy (Happy Fats) Leblanc
 Iry LeJeune
 Rodney Lejeune
 Dennis McGee
 D.L. Menard
 Walter Mouton
 Austin Pitre
 Belton Richard
 Aldus Roger
 Floyd Soileau
 Lawrence Walker

LeCajun Award Winners
The CFMA makes LeCajun awards each year for Band of the Year, Best Accordionist, Best Fiddler, Best Male and Female Vocalist, Song of the Year and Best Recording of the Year. Cajun bands worldwide may receive awards. A Winners' Corner lists those who won the most awards by category.

Appreciation Award  
2015 Mitch Reed

Fiddler of the Year 1994-2009 
2009 Travis Benoit
2008 Joel Savoy
2007 Al Berard
2006 Courtney Granger
2005 Jason Begeron
2004 Louis Dronet
2003 Tony Thibodeaux
2002 Rufus Thibodeaux
2001 Travis Matte
2000 Michael Doucet
1999 Elridge Aguillard
1998 Travis Matte
1997 Travis Matte
1996 David Greely
1995 Terry Huval
1994 Travis Matte

Best Recording with a Fiddle 1989-1993
1993 Terry Huval
1992 Al Berard
1991 Steve Riley / David Greely
1990 Rufus Thibodeaux
1989 Harry LaFleur

Accordionist of the Year 1994-2007
2009 Paul Daigle
2006 Lee Benoit
2005 Jackie Callier
2004 Kevin Naquin
2003 Jackie Caillier
2002 Kevin Naquin
2001 Lee Benoit
2000 Kevin Naquin
1999 Jackie Caillier
1998 Jesse Lege
1997 Horace Trahan
1996 Steve Riley
1995 Reggie Matte
1994 Blake Mouton

Best Recording with an Accordion 1989-1993
1993 Steve Riley
1992 Tim Broussard, Wayne Toups
1991 Steve Riley
1990 Bruce Daigrepont
1989 Bruce Daigrepont

Female Vocalist of the Year
2014 None given
2013 Megan Brown
2012 Jeanette Vanicor Aguillard
2011 Ashley Hayes
2010 Kristi Guillory
2009 Helen (Hélène) Boudreaux
2008 Kira Viator
2006 Valerie Benoit
2005 Les Amies Louisianaises: Jeanette Aguillard, Janet Aguillard, Donna Suarez, Lisa Aguillard
2004 Ashley Hayes
2003 None selected
2002 Eva Touchet
2001 Christine Balfa
2000 Suzanne Fallon-Diaz
1999 Les Amies Louisianaises: Jeanette Aguillard, Janet Aguillard, Shelia Agillard, Donna Thibodeaux
1998 None given
1997 Christine Balfa
1996 Helen Boudreaux
1995 Kristi Guillory
1994 Helen Boudreaux
1993 Ann Savoy
1992 Becky Richard
1991 Becky Richard
1990 Becky Richard
1989 Becky Richard

Male Vocalist of the Year
2006 Lee Benoit
2005 Ivy Dugas
2004 Belton Richard
2003 Ivy Dugas
2002 Ed Gary
2001 Don Fontenot
2000 Kevin Naquin
1999 Ivy Dugas
1998 Ivy Dugas
1997 Ivy Dugas
1996 Robert Jardell
1995 Jo-El Sonnier
1994 Robert Elkins
1993 Robert Elkins
1991 Johnny Sonnier
1992 Johnny Sonnier
1990 Johnny Allen
1989 Robert Elkins

Best First Recording of the Year 1998-2011

2011 "Don't Bury Me" - Ellis Vanicour & the Lacassine Playboys w/ Kaleb Trahan
2010 "Cadien Vien Au Village" - Gerald Thibodeaux & Cajun Accent w/ Ken Stewart, Justin Cormier, Vincent Romero, Larry Comeaux,   Jody Breaux
2009 "Hommage á Andrew Cormier" - Charles Thibodeaux & the Austin Cajun Aces w/ Dale Dougay, Steve Doerr, Tracey Schwartz
2008 Unknown
2007 Unknown
2006 Les Larmes Dans Tes Yeux - Seth Guidry
2005 Charlie Roger and the Lafayette Playboys
2004 "For Old Time Sake" - Ray Abshire and Friends
2003 "La Tete Fille De Carencro" - Al Roger, Terry Cormier & Louisiana Pride
2002 "Deux Vies Pour Te Donner" - Jay Cormier
2001 "A la Vielle Maniere"(The Old Way) w/Jason Frey, Travis Matte, With Lagniappe
2000 "Pour Les Danseur" w/Kenneth Thibodeaux, Jason Frey, Randy Bellard, Jimmy Higginbotham, Ray Thibodeaux, Danny Cormier, Scott Ardoin
1999 "Fier D'etre Cajun" w/Don Fontenot, Eldridge Aguillard, Leighton Thibodeaux, Karl Deshotels, Kurt Daigle, Waven Boone, Freddie Pate, Danny Cormier, Troy Jagneaux
1998 "Memories de Passe" Mack Manuel, Jesse Lege w/Lake Charles Ramblersw/Jesse Lege, Mack Manuel, Orsy "R.C." Vanicor, Elzie Matthews, Robert La Pointe, Leetal Hank

Best First Album/CD by a Band 1996-1997
1997 "Ossun Express" Horace Trahan & Ossun Express w/Horace Trahan, D. L. Menard, Terry Huval, Stacey Huval, Christine Balfa, Nelda Balfa, Kevin Wimmer, Dirk Powell
1996 "Robert Jardell & Pure Cajun" w/Robert Jardell, Milton Melancon, Edwin Guidry, Edmond Guidry, Jody Viator
2009 " 3 Daigles & a Huval, Paul Daigle  Jacob Daigle Braylin Daigle & Calen Huval

Best First Album by a Band 1992-1995
2009 " 3 Daigles & a Huval, Paul Daigle Jacob Daigle Braylin Daigle & Calen Huval
1995 "Reveille" w/Kristi Guillory, Bill Grass
1994 "Beau Thomas & Cajun Power" w/Beau Thomas, Jimmie Barzar, Billy "Botch" Richard, Glen "Chic" Richard, Randy Melancon, Colby Thomas, Joe Simon, "Cajun Power" John Trahan, Robert Jardell, Christine Balfa
1993 "La Musique de Vieux Temps" Joe Simon & the La. Cajuns w/ Joe Simon, Percy Boudreaux, Ed Gary, Mervin Faul, Mark Corbello, Hugh Johnson
1992 "Memories de MaMa" "Danny Brasseaux & Cajun Express" w/Danny Brasseaux, Floyd Brasseaux, Ulysse Poirrier, Kenneth Richard, Ricky Venable, Scotty Hargroder

Award for the Preservation of Traditional Cajun Music 1992 
McCauley, Reed, Vidrine

New Horizon Award 1991 
1991 "Steve Riley & the Mamou Playboys" w/Steve Riley, David Greely, Kevin Barzas, Mike "Chop" Chapman, Christine Balfa

Up & Coming Band 1989-1990
1990 "Sheryl Cormier & Cajun Sound"
1989 "Laissez Faire" w/Ed Billeaud, Wilson Touchet, D. Peters, E. Chapman, R. Monsour

Best Recording of the Year 1998-2007
2006 Bayou Roots by Chris Miller and Bayou Roots
2005 A Bit of Two Worlds - Jackie Callier and the Cajun Cousins
2004 "Bayou Groove" - Kevin Naquin
2003 "Let's Kick Up Some Dust" - Jackie Caillier & The Cajun Cousins
2002 "AuCoup D'eclair" - Kevin Naquin
2001 "Le Necessaire" (The Necessities) w/Don Fontenot et Les Amis de la Louisiane
2000 "Pour La Premiere Fois" Kevin Naquin & the Ossun Playboys w/ Kevin Naquin, John Gary, Louis Dronet, Jody Viator, Dwayne Lavergne, Randy Foreman, Derick Maitre, Tony Daigle
1999 "Je Vas Sortir et Two Step" Jackie Caillier & the Cajun Cousins w/Jackie Caillier, Ivy Dugas, Keith Richard, Benny Mueller, Danny Cormier
1998 "Blacktop the Gravel Road" Jackie Caillier & the Cajun Cousins w/Jackie Caillier, Ivy Dugas, Benny Mueller, Danny Cormier, Keith Richard

Best Album/CD of the Year 1996-1997

1997 "Front Porch Cajun Music" Jackie Caillier & the Cajun Cousins w/Jackie Caillier, Dallas Roy, Ivy James Dugas, John Dale Hebert, Benny Mueller, DannyCormier, Marty Pryor
1996 "Les Petites Heures de la Nuit" Richard LeBouef & Two Step w/Richard LeBouef, Kevin Sonnier, Randy Melancon, Tommy Guidry, Jimmy Hebert, Tim Picard, Darrel Fontenot, Beau Thomas, Camey Doucet

Best Album of the Year 1989-1995
2009 " 3 Daigles & a Huval, Paul Daigle Jacob Daigle Braylin Daigle & Calen Huval
1995 "Laisse Les Jeunes Jouer" Jambalaya Cajun Band
1994 "Cajun Sentiment" Le Band Passe Partout w/Joe Lirette, Robert Elkins, Travis Matte, Percy Boudreaux, Jr., Larry Hoffpauir
1993 "Tit Gailop Pour Mamou" Steve Riley & the Mamou Playboys
1992 "Untit Peu Plus Cajun" Jimmy Breaux w/Michael Doucet, David Doucet, Gary Breaux, U. J. Meaux, Richard Comeaux
1991 (see New Horizon Award)
1990 "Co-eur de Cajun" Bruce Daigrepont & the Bouree Cajun Band
1989 "Stir Up The Roux" Bruce Daigrepont & the Bouree Cajun Band

Song of the Year

2006 "Ma Petite Femme"  Lee Benoit singer/Al Berard songwriter
2005 Biggest Fool in the World - Ivy Dugas (Greatest Hits and More)
2004 "C'est Trop Tard" - Kevin Naquin
2003 "Joues Pas Avec Le Couer Oui T-Aime" - Ivy Dugas
2002 "Belle Louisiane" - Brittany Polaski - vocals / Zachary Richard - songwriter
2001 "The Porch Swing" Don Fonenot singer/Ellis Deshotels songwriter
2000 "Je Suis En Amour Avec La Femme Que J'ai Marier" Kevin Naquin singer & songwriter/John Gary singer/Jean Arceneaux songwriter
1999 "La Visit" Lee Benoit singer & songwriter/Eddie Bodin background vocals/Richard Meaux & Freddie Pate songwriters
1998 "Little Short Pants" Ivy Dugas singer/Vin Bruce & Lee Lavergne songwriters
1997 "The Gravel Road" Ivy Dugas singer & songwriter
1996 "Where Were You Last Wednesday?" Robert Jardell singer/Robert Jardell songwriter
1995 "La Valse de Chere BeBe" Jo-El Sonnier singer/Jo-El Sonnier songwriter
1994 "Ne Phes de Whisky Pour Pop" Robert Elkins singer/John Hebert songwriter
1993 "Je Suis Tout Pour Toi" Robert Elkins singer/John Hebert songwriter
1992 "Late in Life" Wayne Toups singer/Jean Arceneaux songwriter
1991 "Dernier, Dernier Chance" Johnny Sonnier singer/Ken Vallot songwriter
1990 "L Image dans le Mirror" Johnny Sonnier singer/Ken Vallot  & Raymond Taussin songwriters
1989 "La Lumiere dans tor Chassis" Robert Elkins singer/Pierre Varmon Daigle songwriter

Band of the Year
2009 Paul Daigle & Family Gold - Paul Daigle, Jacob Daigle, Braylin Daigle, Calen Huval
2006 Chris Miller and Bayou Roots
2005 Jackie Caillier and the Cajun Cousins
2004 Kevin Naquin and the Ossun Playboys
2003 Jackie Caillier and the Cajun Cousins
2002 Kevin Naquin & the Ossun Playboys - Kevin Naquin, John Gary, Louis Dronet, Jody Viator, Dwayne Lavergne
2001 Don Fontenot et Les Amis de la Louisiane - Don Fontenot, Kurt Daigle, Karl Deshotels, Layton W. Thibodeaux Sr., Mark Young
2000 Kevin Naquin & the Ossun Playboys - Kevin Naquin, John Gary, Louis Dronet, Jody Viator, Dwayne Lavergne, Randy Foreman, Derick Maitre, Tony Daigle
1999 Jackie Caillier & the Cajun Cousins - Jackie Caillier, Ivy Dugas, Keith Richard, Benny Mueller, Danny Cormier
1998 Jackie Caillier & the Cajun Cousins - Jackie Caillier, Ivy James Dugas, Benny Mueller, Danny Cormier, Keith Richard
1996 Robert Jardell & Pure Cajun - Robert Jardell, Milton Melancon, Edwin Guidry, Edmond Guidry, Jody Viator
1997 Jackie Caillier & the Cajun Cousins - Jackie Caillier, Dallas Roy, Ivy James Dugas, John Dale Hebert, Benny Mueller, Danny Cormier, Marty Pryor
1995 Steve Riley & the Mamou Playboys - Steve Riley, David Greely, Peter Schwarz
1994 Steve Riley & the Mamou Playboys - Steve Riley, David Greely, Kevin Dugas, Peter Schwarz, Kevin Barzar, Christine Balfa, Sonny Landreth
1993 Steve Riley & the Mamou Playboys - Steve Riley, David Greely, Kevin Barzar, Mike Chapman, Christine Balfa
1992 Johnny Sonnier & Cajun Heritage - Johnny Sonnier, Leroy Dugas, Jr., Jessie Credeur, Chad Cormier, Russell Quebodeaux
1991 Steve Riley & the Mamou Playboys
1990 Paul Daigle & Cajun Gold - Paul Daigle, Robert Elkins, Tony Thibodeaux, Kelly Hebert, Vernon Bergeron
1989 Paul Daigle & Cajun Gold - Paul Daigle, Robert Elkins, Tony Thibodeaux, Kelly Hebert, Vernon Bergeron

People's Choice Award ( First presented in 2005)
2009 - 3 Daigles and a Huval - Paul Daigle & Family Gold
2007 - Old Style Cajun Music-Al Berard/Jason Frey
2006 - Bayou Roots by Chris Miller and Bayou Roots
2005 - A Bit of Two Worlds - Jackie Callier and the Cajun Cousins

Best Single Recording 1992-1993

1993 Robert Elkins "Je Suis Tout Pour Tois"
1992 Johnny Sonnier/Helen Boudreaux "Tears Become A Rose"
1991 Richard LeBeouf "Acadiana Two-Step"
1990 Sheryl Cormier
1989 Johnny Sonnier "Paul Daigle on the Juke Box"

Most Traditional Cajun Band
This award was initiated in 1989 by Chairman Pete Bergeron to encourage bands to play and record the traditional style of Cajun Music 
1990 Jesse Lege & the Jeff Davis Ramblers
1989 Jesse Lege & the Jeff Davis Ramblers
This Award is discontinued

Prix Dehors de Nous
This award was given a plaque prior to 1996. In years 1996, 1997, 1998 & 1999 the winner band was awarded one "Le Cajun". Beginning in 2000, each band member of the winner band is awarded a "Le Cajun".

2010 Cajun Strangers, Madison Wis (winner) "Cajun Country Ramble"
2006-2007 Cajun Strangers, Madison Wis (winner) "Valse a Deux Temps"   
2004-2005 San Diego Cajun Playboys, San Diego, CA (winner)-"Small Town Two-Step"; Boiling Bayou,
Denmark (1st runner-up)-"Boiling Bayou";
Cleoma's Ghost (second runner-up)-"Mon Coeur Est Avec Toi"
2003 The New Riverside Ramblers, Minneapolis/St. Paul, MN (winner) "Saute la Barriere"
Bal De Mason Band, France (1st runner-up) "Ce Soir Au Bayou Ecrevisses"
The Hackney Ramblers, England, (2nd runner-up)"Saturday Night Special"
2001 Cajun du Nord of Denmark, Norway & Sweden (winner) "In Louisiana"
Trans Bayou Express of France (lst runner-up) "Voyage dans le pays Cajun"
Catfish of Australia (2nd runner-up) "Two-Step at a Time"
2000 The Bone Tones of Minneapolis/St. Paul, MN (winner) "Live Recordings"
Ziga Zag of England (lst runner-up) "Desperately Seeking Boudin"
How's Bayou of Seattle, WA (2nd runner-up) "Pardon My French"
1999 Cayenne Cajun Band, Seattle Wash. (winner) "Live at Greenwood"
Manuel Family Band, Nashville, TN (1st runner-up) "Leissey Les Bon Temps Rouler"
Acadian Ramblers Band, Holland (2nd runner-up) "Ghost Dance"
1998 Squeeze Bayou, Va.-Washington D.C. area (winner) "Stepping Fast"
Vermenton Plage, France, "Lache Pas La Patate" (1st runner-up)
The Colorado Cajun Dance Band, "Colorado Cajun Dance" (2nd runner-up)
1997 Tracy Schwarz & the Cajun Trio, W. Va.. (winner)
Cajun Company, (1st runner up)
Atlanta Swamp Opera, Atlanta, Ga. (2nd runner up)
1996 Bon Tons, Minneapolis, Mn. (winner)
Danny Poullard & The California Cajun Orchestra, California (1st runner up)
The Magnolias, Providence R.I. & eastern Mass. (2nd runner up)
1995 Danny Poullard & The California Cajun Orchestra, California (winner)
2003 Cajun Company (winner) "La robe de Rosalie"

References

Music of Louisiana
Cajun music